Tondisaar is an island in the southern part of Estonia's second-largest lake, Võrtsjärv. 

Tondisaar is the only inland nesting place for Great cormorants in Estonia.

See also 
 List of islands of Estonia

References 

Lake islands of Estonia